Reggae Geel is a reggae music festival that takes place in Geel, Belgium, typically on the first Friday of August, with reggae deejays and sound systems, followed by the main festival on the following Saturday. Reggae Geel is the oldest Reggae festival in Europe. It is particularly well known for its relaxed, non-commercial atmosphere and considered by many artists as the most Jamaican-like reggae festival outside Jamaica.

Line-up of Reggae Geel

See also

List of reggae festivals
Reggae

References

External links
Official site

Reggae festivals
Music festivals in Belgium
Geel
Summer events in Belgium